At Your Orders, Madame is a 1939 Italian "white-telephones" comedy film directed by Mario Mattoli and starring Antonio Gandusio.

Cast
 Elsa Merlini as Manon
 Vittorio De Sica as Pietro Haguet
 Giuditta Rissone as Evelina Watron
 Enrico Viarisio as Paolo Vernisset
 Enzo Biliotti as Fleury Valée
 Pina Renzi as Madame Bagnol
 Armando Migliari as Il notaio
 Elena Altieri as Ginette
 Achille Majeroni s L'attore
 Luigi Pavese as Il maître d'hotel
 Lauro Gazzolo as Il cameriere all'albergo
 Ernesto Almirante as Lorot, l'impiegato del notaio

See also
Breakfast at Sunrise (1927)

References

External links

1939 films
1930s Italian-language films
1939 comedy films
Italian black-and-white films
Films directed by Mario Mattoli
Italian comedy films
1930s Italian films